The 1974 Boston College Eagles football team represented Boston College as an independent during the 1974 NCAA Division I football season. In its seventh season under head coach Joe Yukica, the team compiled an 8–3 record and outscored opponents by a total of 365 to 154. 

Quarterback Mike Kruczek set an NCAA major college, single-season record by completing 68.9% of his passes. He completed  104 of 151 passes for 1,274 passing yards, six touchdowns, and seven interceptions.  Running back Keith Barnette totaled 1,097 rushing yards and 132 points scored on 22 rushing touchdowns, and wide receiver Dave Zumbach had 43 receptions for 557 yards and four touchdowns. 

The team played its home games at Alumni Stadium in Chestnut Hill, Massachusetts.

Schedule

References

Boston College
Boston College Eagles football seasons
Boston College Eagles football
Boston College Eagles football